Teatro 8 is a theater venue located in the Little Havana neighborhood of Miami, Florida.

History
Teatro 8, which opened in 2000, was originally operated by the Hispanic Theater Guild, a Miami-based theater organization founded in 1989 with the involvement of Cuban American actor-director Marcos Casanova. Teatro 8 hosts frequent Spanish-language theater premiers, as well as productions of standards in the Hispanic theater repertoire. As of July 1, 2014, the venue will be managed by the Argentine group "Cirko Teatro," created by Jessica Alvarez Dieguez and Alejandro Vales.

Teatro 8 lies in the center of the action on Miami's bustling Calle Ocho, a cultural hotspot for Cuban-American shops, restaurants, and museums. At its conception in 2000, Teatro 8 provided the only sit-down entertainment on Calle Ocho, bringing in crowds from all over the world to Little Havana for a small taste of Cuban culture. Since then, the theater has put on more than 250 productions for audiences of all ages, nationalities, religions, and socioeconomic statuses. Teatro 8 prides itself in being able to offer low-cost tickets in order to make Latinx theatre accessible to all who want to enjoy it. Ticket prices range from $10, $15, $35, and, at most, $80. 
 The theater features Spanish-language productions spanning all genres, from musicals to comedies to ballets and dance performances. Although they put on all kinds of productions, the recent spike in interest for their comedies has led to it being their most often performed genre and their most lucrative. 
The venue offers several acting courses for aspiring actors of all ages, making it a popular Summer camp site for Latinx children and young adults interested in the arts. 
Teatro 8's busiest time of year is Winter, where they can put up to 16 productions per week.

Notes and references

External links
 The Hispanic Theater Guild records are available at the Cuban Heritage Collection, University of Miami Libraries. This archival collection contains records relating to the Teatro 8 theater venue in Miami, Florida, run by the Hispanic Theater Guild organization. Items include theater ephemera and posters, audiovisual materials of performances, awards and certificates, financial records, clippings, scripts, scrapbooks, and promotional materials.
 Venue page for Teatro 8 in the Cuban Theater Digital Archive.

Production History

Teatro 8 has put on many successful productions since its conception in the year 2000. Their most notable have been: 

“Cien Veces No Debo” A comedy written by Ricardo Talesnik

“Esperando la Carroza” An Argentine-Uruguayan classic written by Jacobo Lagsner

“Deliciosa Provocacion” A story written by Santiago Escalante

“Las Novias de Travolta” A comedy written by Andres Tulipano

“Bajo Terapia” A comedy written by Matias Del Frederico

“El Principio de Arquimedes” A controversial history lesson written by Josep Maria Miro

“TOC TOC” A comedy written by Laurent Baffie

Cuban-American culture in Miami
Theatre companies in Miami
Hispanic and Latino American culture in Miami